Security is the degree of protection against danger, damage, loss, and crime.

Security may also refer to:

 Airport security
 Computer security
 Energy security
 Food security
 Security of person, a human right as defined by the United Nations
 Information security
 Juridical security, also called legal security
 National security
 Physical security
 Social security

Finance
 Economic security
 Security (finance), a financial instrument
 Security interest in a financial transaction (in law and business)

Music
 Security (album), the U.S./Canada title for the self-titled 1982 studio album by Peter Gabriel
 "Security", a 1988 song by The Beat Club
 "Security", a 2006 cover by the Freestylers from the album Adventures in Freestyle
 "Security", a song by Etta James off her album Tell Mama
 "Security (Don't Wash My Blanket)", a song by Hap Palmer
 "Security", a song by Stacie Orrico from her eponymous album
 "Security", a song by Royce da 5'9" from his studio album Success Is Certain

Other uses
 Security (film), a 2017 American action film
 "Security" (The Unit), a television episode
 ST Security, a British tugboat
 Security, Colorado, a census-designated place in the United States

See also
 Security convergence
 Securitas (disambiguation)